Taebaeksaukia spinata is a species of trilobites in the family Dikelocephalidae, which existed in what is now Korea during the upper Furongian period. It was described in 2011, and is the only species in the genus Taebaeksaukia.

References

Dikelocephalidae
Asaphida genera
Cambrian trilobites
Fossil taxa described in 2011
Monotypic arthropod genera
Prehistoric arthropods of Asia